Jeremiah: A Drama in Nine Scenes, or Jeremias, is a 1917 play written in German by Stefan Zweig. Written while he was a soldier, it reflects his pacifist sentiments and Jewish religious background, and ends with the line "A people can be put in chains, its spirit, never."

Thomas Adam wrote that Zweig later used the work as a point of departure for addressing the rise of Nazism, culminating in The Royal Game (Schachnovelle, a novella written in 1938–'41 and posthumously published in 1942).

References 

1917 plays